Amalia of Saxony (4 April 1436 – 19 November 1501) was a princess of Saxony and by marriage Duchess of Bavaria-Landshut.

Life 
Amalia was born in Meissen. She was the oldest of the children of the elector Frederick II of Saxony (1412–1464) from his marriage to Margaret (1416/7–1486), daughter of the Duke Ernest of Austria.

Amalia married on 21 March 1452 in Landshut Duke Louis IX of Bavaria-Landshut (1417–1479). Like the wedding of the son later, this marriage was celebrated with splendour. 22,000 guests were invited. In 1463, Amalia received Burghausen Castle from her husband as a residence. He also prescribed a comprehensive and rigorous Court discipline. Amalia is one of the founders of the Holy Spirit Church in Burghausen.

After the death of her husband, Amalia left Bavaria. From the compensation for her Wittum, she received 800 Rhenish florins per year from her son. Amalia acquired from her brothers and Rochlitz Castle and district, where she lived with a large entourage. Here, she rebuilt  the chapel in the castle and built St. Peter's Church in the town of Rochlitz. Her most precious collection of relics was kept in the chapel. Amalia in the residence time is also the new building of St. Peter's Church in Rochlitz. Amalia essentially rebuilt the castle as a palace. The city experienced a boom during her time in office.

The Duchess died in Rochlitz in 1501 and was buried in the Cathedral of Meissen.

Issue 
From her marriage to Louis, Amalia had the following children:
 Elisabeth (1452–1457)
 George, Duke of Bavaria (15 August 1455 – 1 December 1503), Duke of Bavaria-Landshut
 married in princess Hedwig Jagiellon (1457–1502)
 Margaret (7 November 1456 – 25 February 1501)
 married on 21 February 1474 to Philip the Sincere
 Anna (1462–1462)

Ancestors

References 
 Martina Schattkowsky: Widow in the early Modern Age: princely and aristocratic widows between external and self-determination, p. 69 ff
 August Kluckhohn: Louis the Rich, Duke of Bavaria: History of Germany in the 15th Century, p 314 ff

External links 
 https://web.archive.org/web/20120315001257/http://www.vilsbiburg.info/wappen4/historisch/pfarrkirche/wappen/wappen.htm
 http://www.guide2womenleaders.com/womeninpower/Womeninpower1450.htm

|-

House of Wettin
1436 births
1501 deaths
Saxon princesses
Duchesses of Bavaria
Daughters of monarchs